Irakleia (Ηράκλεια) may refer to several places in Greece:

Irakleia, Arta, a municipal unit in Arta regional unit 
Irakleia, Elis, a village in Elis
Irakleia, Cyclades, an island in the Cyclades
Irakleia, Serres, a municipality in Serres regional unit 
Irakleia, Phthiotis, a village in Phthiotis regional unit

See also 

 Heraklion (disambiguation)
 Heraclea (disambiguation) 
 Irakleio (disambiguation)